Lawndale may refer to either of two neighborhoods on the far west side of the city of Chicago:

 South Lawndale, Chicago
 North Lawndale, Chicago

See also
 Neighborhoods of Chicago
 Community areas of Chicago
 Lawndale (disambiguation)